Faith and Action in the Nation’s Capital, now known as Faith and Liberty, is a Christian outreach organization ministering to top-level government officials.  The organizational headquarters is located in Washington, D.C. across the street from the east façade of the United States Supreme Court.  From there, they provide numerous personal ministries to elected officials and their staff, conduct worship services, sponsor religious oriented events, as well as providing media commentary on faith issues that are interwoven within governmental and legal matters.  Faith and Action also serves as a resource on questions of church and state.

Purpose

Faith and Action is an ecumenical ministry which represents common Christian beliefs and values.  They state that their organizational statement-of-faith is the historic Apostles' Creed.  The mission statement on their website, “Faith and Action” states that their purpose is “to challenge the minds and consciences of public policy makers with the mandate given by Christ in the two Great Commandments, ‘You shall love the LORD your God with all your heart, with all your soul, with all your mind, and with all your strength,’ and ‘You shall love your neighbor as yourself.’ (Matthew 22:36-40 KJV)

Birth of Faith and Action
In August 1994, President Rev. Rob Schenck moved from Tonawanda (Buffalo area), New York where he served as Minister of Missions and Evangelism at the New Covenant Tabernacle to Washington D.C. to begin an outreach to policy makers.  His first assignment in Washington was to organize a church fellowship.  He started the National Community Church.  In early 1996, Schenck passed the mantle to Mark Batterson and began to concentrate fully on his outreach ministry to policy makers.  Initially known as “Operation Save Our Nation” it became known as “Faith and Action in the Nation’s Capital” or simply “Faith and Action”.  In 2000, an ordaining council of the Come Alive New Testament Church of Medford, New Jersey officially commissioned Rev. Schenck as a missionary to Capitol Hill.

Schenck served as president until 2018, the year Faith and Action changed its name, eventually becoming Faith and Liberty.

Mission

Description
Faith and Action is a Christian outreach to top-level government officials located in Washington, DC, throughout the United States and around the world. They seek to base their outreach on a personal relationship with the person targeted.

Relationships
Faith and Action states that the way they seek to accomplish their purpose of engaging the hearts and minds of government officials is “through building personal relationships with individuals serving in government, engaging in private and public conversation and debate, distributing Scripture and informative materials and staging special events such as panel discussions, symposia, news conferences, seminars and prayer, worship and preaching services.”

Faith and Action seeks to include the media, electronic communications, the Internet and church leadership.  Because church leadership and preaching is integral to the way they support and promulgate their message, Faith and Action believes in and works hard to build strong alliances with all like-minded individuals, groups, religious communities, churches, organizations and institutions.  Faith and Action is a non-denominational outreach organization working with Evangelical, mainline Protestant, Catholic, Orthodox and other groups to promote Christian viewpoints among government, law, and policymakers.

Methodology
Schenck, the founder of Faith and Action, says their desire is to “win the hearts and minds of those who make public policy” and also that Faith and Action is “a Christian outreach whose mission is to reintroduce the Word of God into the public debate surrounding legislation and policy matters." Faith and Action targets elected officials, government employees, Supreme Court justices and clerks, and other government personnel.

Faith and Action is a registered tax-exempt organization under the Internal Revenue Code, section 501(c)3.

Staff
Rev. Rob Schenck: founder and President until 2018
Peggy Neinaber: Chief of Program and Executive Assistant to the President since 2005
R. Todd Gates: staff writer
Nicholas Olsen: News Reporter.

The Honorable William Ostrowski House
The organization itself is headquartered in the Honorable William J. Ostrowski House, named for the retired New York State Supreme Court judge and long-time supporter of the Schenck brothers’ efforts. The 19th Century Victorian Row House sits directly across from East Façade of the U.S. Supreme Court building at 109 2nd Street, NE.  A notable feature of the ministry office is a granite sculpture depicting the Ten Commandments displayed in the building’s front garden.  The most noticeable non-architectural feature is what Rob Schenck calls “our two story Gospel tract”.  This is the often-changing 20 foot banners that hang above the buildings front door and proclaim scriptural messages to passersby and attenders of the Supreme Court.

Cora Bieber Garden at F&A
Another feature of the property is the Cora Bieber Garden, named for Lancaster Pennsylvania’s Cora Bieber who was extremely active in the Global Aid Network as well as  Faith and Action.  In 2007, Global Aid Network and her family dedicated the Garden after Cora’s passing from a rare bone marrow disease.

Louis and Tina Kayatin Prayer Garden
The Louis and Tina Kayatin Prayer Garden is a public full season garden around the rear of the building with a sitting area and umbrellas, set aside for prayer and meditation.  Flowers are planted in varieties that bloom at various times of the season create a sense of beauty and peace for the full growing season.

The Ten Commandments Garden Statue
A notable feature of the ministry office is a granite sculpture depicting the Ten Commandments displayed in the building’s front garden.  On Memorial Day in 2006, the monument was placed in the front of the building, readily noticeable from the street.

Ten Commandments Project
The Ten Commandments Project is an ongoing operation of Faith and Action.  Faith and Action's motto is "bringing the word of God to bear on the hearts and minds of those who make public policy in America." One of its goals is to "restore the moral foundations of our American culture" through placing Ten Commandments displays in public buildings.

Created in 1995, Faith and Action’s Ten Commandments Project has given over 400 plaques depicting the Ten Commandments to members of Congress and other highly placed officials, including former presidents Clinton and Bush. Special delegations made up of clergy and lay people make the presentations during ceremonies held in the recipients’ offices. The agenda includes a short speech describing religion as the foundational basis of morality and law, a reading of the Commandments in their entirety, and prayers. The official is then given an inscribed wooden plaque on which is mounted two stone polymer tablets containing a summary of the Ten Commandments. Recipients are urged to “display and obey” the Ten Commandments.

Schenck chose to promote the Ten Commandments because he believes that they have a universal and enduring nature and that they are fundamental to morality.

Anti-abortion work
Faith and Action is a member of the National Pro-Life Religious Council and is involved in the various anti-abortion activities and events in DC as well as Rev. Schenck’s personal ministry.  Faith and Action’s anti-abortion stand encompasses the gamut of issues.  Not only is Faith and Action a major sponsor the National Memorial for the Preborn and Their Mothers and Fathers (the only full scale prayer and preaching service held annually inside the U.S. Capitol), Rev. Schenck participated in the events surrounding Terri Schiavo.
Among other things, Schenck traveled to Florida to try to prevent Schiavo from being allowed to die, including publicly calling for police to prevent the same. He was also a signatory of a letter to President George Bush and Florida Gov. Jeb Bush by national anti-abortion leaders. In 2005, Faith and Action intervened in the case of Susan Torres;  a brain-dead pregnant woman being kept on life support so that she could give birth.  Faith and Action served as the clearinghouse for the outpouring of donations to the Torres family.

National Memorial for the Preborn
In 1995, Rev. Schenck organized the first National Memorial for the Preborn and their Mothers and Fathers. This Memorial is a religious service against abortion. This quickly became a prominent anti-abortion event held inside the US Capitol complex in Washington, DC. Originally a program of the National Clergy Council, the event has now been renamed the National Pro-Life Clergy Conference and is sponsored by the National Pro-Life Religious Council. The NPRC is led by prominent anti-abortion leader Fr. Frank Pavone, national director of Priests for Life and a trustee of Schenck’s Faith and Action. Rev. Schenck and his staff continue to have major roles and responsibilities associated with the event.

The Nativity Project
In 2005 Faith and Action ministry began sponsoring a Capitol Hill Nativity Scene during the Christmas season.  This was set in the front of the Faith and Action Center on second Street across from the Supreme Court. In 2010, they begin a “Live Nativity” scene where the characters and animals will be living and in costume.

More than this, Faith and Action co-sponsors, with the Christian Defense Coalition and Operation Nativity (an effort by the Rev. Dr. Charles Nestor of Lakeland, Florida). “The Nativity Project” by encouraging Christian individuals and organizations to request and place Nativity Scenes in front of Public buildings."

Annual Events

Included in these events are the regular seasonal events that are sponsored by Faith and Action.  These are in confluence with the Christian calendar
 Live nativity at the US Supreme Court-  This live nativity scene is held on the grounds of the Faith and Action Center which is across from the Supreme Court and uses live actors (and animals) in period costume to portray the biblical narrative of the birth of Christ.
 Christmas Outreach- The details of the Christmas Outreach to government officials changes every year but Advent, the Faith and Action team is making a special outreach effort every year to those policy makers for Christmas.  Because of ethics laws, government officials cannot receive gifts, however small monetary value tokens are acceptable.  So, Faith and Action gives a small Christmas “gift” as a token of their care.  In 2010, they dropped off copies of a Christmas Edition New Testament to their mission charges on Capitol Hill.
Easter Outreach- Like the Christmas Outreach, the specifics of the Easter Outreach change yearly but the religious message of Easter is shared with government officials in the U.S. government.  For example, one year Faith and Action gave each a copy of the DVD of Mel Gibson’s film “The Passion of the Christ” as their Easter outreach.
National Memorial for the Preborn and their Mothers and Fathers- In January, on the anniversary of the Roe v. Wade Supreme Court decision, Faith and Action joins other anti-abortion organizations in sponsoring this Service of Worship and Prayer.
Bible Reading Marathon-  In conjunction with the National Day of Prayer in May, Faith and Action helps organize a 72-hour Bible reading marathon where the scriptures are read on the steps of the nation’s capitol.  Rain or shine, continuously, the Bible is read by a parade of people until the entire Bible is completed aloud.
The Family Circle Dinner- In October, Faith and Action sponsors a dinner for friends and supporters in which they can share the details of their work on Capitol Hill.
Passover Seder- At Passover, Rev. Schenck leads a traditional Seder meal and service, which he says is a historic tie to the Judaic roots of Christianity, Jesus having led a seder at the Last Supper.

Ministry

The Faith and Action work is directly religious in nature.  While Faith and Action speaks out on issues of religious significance, they perform activities that are more in keeping with a church.  Rev. Schenk used a ritual of blessing and prayer to seek divine guidance for the committee and the jurist during the confirmation hearings of Supreme Court Justices Samuel Alito. and Sonja Sotomayor  A similar anointing and prayer ritual was used to seek God’s guidance for President Obama when Rev. Schenck anointed the doorway to the inauguration through which the president elect would walk to the Inaugural stage.  This was part of a 19-day effort of prayer and fasting for Obama and his presidency. This was a continuation of official prayer for the new president that began with President George W. Bush’s Second term.

Activism

Monument relocation from Ohio
In May 2009, Rev. Schenck joined Republican Rep. Jean Schmidt and other Ohio leaders help relocate a Ten Commandments sculpture. The 3-foot by 3-foot granite sculpture, which weighs 850 pounds, is one of four monuments removed by federal court order from the fronts of public schools in rural Adams County, Ohio.  The monument was placed in a prominent position on private property. The site also includes a flower garden and flagpole. The flag raised was one which had been previously flown above the U.S. Capitol building.  The monument is identical to the one situated in the front of the Faith and Action ministry center on Capitol Hill.

Miscellaneous
Rev. Schenck appeared briefly in the Alexandra Pelosi documentary about the Evangelical movement, "Friends of God: A Road Trip with Alexandra Pelosi."

References List

External links
 

Christian missions